Antoni Pérez i Moya (1884–1964) was a Spanish choral conductor and composer of Catalan descent. One of his best known pieces is Marinada. His son :es:Antoni Pérez Simó (1920–1996) continued his educational work and was also a composer.

References

1964 deaths
1884 births
Spanish composers
Spanish male composers
Spanish conductors (music)
Male conductors (music)
20th-century conductors (music)
20th-century Spanish male musicians